This is a list of all companies currently operating at least one commercial communication satellite or currently has one on order.

Global Top 20

The World Teleport Association publishes lists of companies based on revenues from all customized communications sources and includes operators of teleports and satellite fleets. In order from largest to smallest, the Global Top 20 of 2021 were:

   SES (Luxembourg)
SES (Luxembourg)
Intelsat S.A. (Luxembourg)
EchoStar Satellite Services (USA)
Hughes Network Systems (USA)
Eutelsat (France)
Arqiva (UK)
Telesat (Canada)
Speedcast (USA)
Telespazio S.p.A.(Italy)
Encompass Digital Media (USA)
SingTel Satellite (Singapore)
Hispasat (Spain)
Globecast (France)
Liquid Intelligent Technologies (South Africa)
Russian Satellite Communications Company (Russia)
Telstra (Australia)
MEASAT Global (Malaysia)
Thaicom (Thailand)
du (UAE)
Gazprom Space Systems (Russia)

List

References

 
Satellite broadcasting
Space lists
Satellite